The Hamilton Redbirds were a minor league baseball team that played in the New York–Penn League from 1988 to 1992. They were affiliated with the St. Louis Cardinals and played their home games at Bernie Arbour Memorial Stadium in Hamilton, Ontario. The Redbirds were founded in 1988, but the franchise itself was founded in 1958 as the Auburn Yankees. It moved to Erie, Pennsylvania, for the 1981 season, beginning its longtime affiliation with the St. Louis Cardinals. The Erie Cardinals played at Ainsworth Field in Erie, Pennsylvania, from 1981 to 1987. The Erie Cardinals then relocated to Hamilton, Ontario, to become the Hamilton Redbirds. The Hamilton Redbirds set the all-time record for winning percentage by a St. Louis Cardinals minor league team at .651 in 1992, with a record of 56-20.  Future Major League players Keith Johns and Mike Gulan lead the offensive attack along with unsung centerfielder Brad Owens. Lefty David Orlein and righty T.J. Mathews (en route to an MLB career) both posted a 10-1 mark, and closer Jamie Cochrane set a NY-Penn League saves record with 40.

In their five seasons at Bernie Arbour Stadium, the Redbirds developed future Major League talent that included NFL Pro Bowl defensive back Brian Jordan, pitchers Allen Watson and Donovan Osborne. The Redbirds inaugural season also featured a rarity when Auburn Astros centrefielder Kenny Lofton hit into an unassisted triple play to the hands of first baseman Joe Federico. Federico's glove and #24 jersey were secured by the Canadian Baseball Hall of Fame. However, as the result of a reporting error by the official scorer to the Elias Sports Bureau (then league statisticians) the rare feat is not logged in league records.

From 1989 to 1992 the club's general manager was Suffern, New York native Ben Liotta. He was a graduate of Cortland State University and was handed the reins of the operations when traveled Minor League executive Ric Jacobson was released after one season. For the most part Liotta along with Hamilton native Tony Torre ran the front office operations. The two forged an alliance with former Ontario Premier Larry Grossman in an attempt to save Minor League baseball for Hamilton when they bid on an expansion Class AA franchise in the Eastern League. The bid failed as the result of local governments unwillingness to build a stadium that met with Minor League standards. City council also rejected a rumored proposal by Rosart Properties that would have seen the developer construct a stadium at no cost to the city in exchange for a 3-acre tract of land to offset costs with a commercial property. While local government was not supportive there were voices at city council including mayor Robert Morrow and alderman Tom Murray who tried hard to salvage the bid.

The Redbirds were the quintessential minor league team that featured unique promotions such as Camel Races, The San Diego Chicken, the zany antics of baseball clown Max Patkin and the national anthem was a recording of Montreal Canadiens famed anthem singer Roger Doucet.

The Hamilton Redbirds relocated to East Field in Glens Falls, New York in 1993 to become the Glens Falls Redbirds. After the 1993 season, the Glens Falls Redbirds were then relocated to Skylands Park located in Augusta, New Jersey in 1994 to become the New Jersey Cardinals. Today, the franchise is now stationed in University Park, Pennsylvania, located right outside of State College, Pennsylvania. The franchise is now known as the State College Spikes.

Year-by-year record

See also
Former players

References

Baseball teams established in 1988
Sports clubs disestablished in 1992
Sports teams in Hamilton, Ontario
Baseball teams in Ontario
St. Louis Cardinals minor league affiliates
Defunct baseball teams in Canada
Defunct New York–Penn League teams
1988 establishments in Ontario
1992 disestablishments in Ontario